Ricardo Ruiz Pérez, better known as Ricky Rick, is a Mexican singer, rapper and former vocalist for the band A.B. Quintanilla y Los Kumbia All Starz. He has a successful career with Kumbia All Starz, performing songs such as "Mami" "Rica y Apretadita" and "Por Ti Baby." The singer-songwriter Ricky commenced his musical profession when a friend introduced him to A.B. Quintanilla who at the time was auditioning members for a new musical concept. Barely two days after a brief telephone audition, A.B. flew him to Texas to start recording the songs that would then become megahits for the band.

Early life 
Ricky Rick was born Ricardo Ruiz Pérez and raised in his native Monterrey, Nuevo León.

At 15, back in Monterrey, he started performing with various local bands. At 17, he learned to play percussion and drums and continued singing and performing, all the while working towards obtaining his bachelor's degree in business from the Universidad Regiomontana in Monterrey.

Career 
The singer-songwriter Ricky commenced his musical profession when a friend introduced him to A.B. Quintanilla who at the time was auditioning members for a new musical concept. Barely two days after a brief telephone audition, A.B. flew him to Texas to start recording the songs that would then become megahits for the band. After spending 4 years travelling the world, playing sold-out shows and collaborating with many great musical minds including A.B., Melissa Jiménez on "Rica y Apretadita" and Flex on "Por Ti Baby" and "Besos de Amor", he decided it was time to venture out on his own and as such, teamed up with former Kumbia Kings lead singer, after the two discussed the idea while on a trip to Bolivia. The two had previously performed on stage together when they formed part of the Kumbia All Starz. " Ricky Rick's Debut solo album is said to be a fusion of urban and cumbia laced with electronic rhythms and will be released late 2018.

Discography

Studio albums

Albums With Kumbia All Starz 
2006: Ayer Fue Kumbia Kings, Hoy Es Kumbia All Starz
2008: Planeta Kumbia
2015: Welcome to MI STEREO

Singles 
2011: "Contigo Me Voy" (with DJ Kane)
2011: "Quiero Beber" (with DJ Kane & Maffio Alkatraks)
2018: "Cerquita de mi" (with Flex
2018: "Sandunguea"

Featured singles 
2010: "Besos de Amor" (Flex featuring Ricky Rick)
2011: "Tú Como Yo" (Cynthia featuring Ricky Rick)
2018: "Cerquita De Mi"
(Flex featuring Ricky Rick)

External links 
 Official Facebook

References 

Beatboxers
Capitol Latin artists
Cumbia musicians
EMI Latin artists
Kumbia All Starz members
Living people
Mexican male rappers
Mexican male singer-songwriters
Mexican singer-songwriters
Mexican musicians
Mexican people of Panamanian descent
Singers from Monterrey
Spanish-language singers
Year of birth missing (living people)